Cryptobatis is a genus of beetles in the family Carabidae, containing the following species:

 Cryptobatis brevipennis Chaudoir, 1877 
 Cryptobatis chontalensis Bates, 1883 
 Cryptobatis cyanoptera (Dejean, 1825) 
 Cryptobatis hexagona Putzeys, 1846 
 Cryptobatis inaequalis Chaudoir, 1877 
 Cryptobatis janthinipennis (Buquet, 1834) 
 Cryptobatis janthoptera Reiche, 1842 
 Cryptobatis laticollis Brulle, 1838

References

Lebiinae
Beetles of North America
Beetles described in 1829
Taxa named by Johann Friedrich von Eschscholtz